Chaudhry Iftikhar Nazir (born 10 June 1956) is a Pakistani politician who has been a member of the National Assembly of Pakistan, since August 2018. Previously he was a member of the National Assembly from June 2008 to May 2018.
Some people said belongs to jahanian.

Early life
He was born on 10 June 1956. He Belongs to an Arain Family.

Political career
He ran for the seat of the National Assembly of Pakistan as a candidate of Pakistan Peoples Party (PPP) from Constituency NA-159 (Khanewal-IV) in 2002 Pakistani general election but was unsuccessful. He received 74,209 votes and lost the seat to Malik Ghulam Murtaza Maitla, a candidate of Pakistan Muslim League (Q) (PML-Q).

He was elected to the National Assembly as a candidate of PPP from Constituency NA-159 (Khanewal-IV) in 2008 Pakistani general election. He received 78,255 votes and defeated Malik Ghulam Murtaza Maitla, a candidate of PML-Q.

He was re-elected to the National Assembly as a candidate of Pakistan Muslim League (N) (PML-N) from Constituency NA-159 (Khanewal-IV) in 2013 Pakistani general election. He received 116,903 votes and defeated Malik Ghulam Murtaza Maitla, a candidate of Pakistan Tehreek-e-Insaf (PTI).

He was re-elected to the National Assembly as a candidate of PML-N from Constituency NA-153 (Khanewal-IV) in 2018 Pakistani general election.

Fakhar-e-Khanewal
Chaudhry Iftikhar Nazir is third time Member National Assembly from District Khanewal. He is also known with title of "FAKHAR-E-KHANEWAL".

Chairman Standing Committee for Defense Production
Chaudhry Iftikhar Nazir is also Chairman Standing Committee for Defense Production.

References

Living people
Pakistan Muslim League (N) politicians
Punjabi people
Pakistani MNAs 2013–2018
1956 births
Pakistani MNAs 2008–2013
Pakistani MNAs 2018–2023